All-trans-10'-apo-beta-carotenal 13,14-cleaving dioxygenase (CCD8 (gene), MAX4 (gene), NCED8 (gene)) is an enzyme with systematic name all-trans-10'-apo-beta-carotenal:O2 oxidoreductase (13,14-cleaving). This enzyme catalyses the following chemical reaction

 all-trans-10'-apo-beta-carotenal + O2  13-apo-beta-carotenone + (2E,4E,6E)-4-methylocta-2,4,6-trienedial

The enzyme contains Fe2+.

References

External links 
 

EC 1.13.11